Payne Park is a former baseball field from 1924 to 1990 in Sarasota, Florida. Payne Park today is a  public park used for recreational events.

History

Ballpark
The ballpark was erected in 1924 and was a long time spring training and minor league site for baseball clubs such as the Boston Red Sox, Chicago White Sox and the New York Giants. The Los Angeles Dodgers played their home spring training games at Payne Park in 1959.

The park ceased its association with professional baseball in 1989 with the construction of Ed Smith Stadium and the ballpark was demolished.

The ballpark was refurbished on multiple occasions. Prior to Spring Training 1951, the City of Sarasota added 600 permanent bleachers, increasing capacity to just over 4,000. The size of the press-box was doubled as well.

Norman Rockwell's 1957 painting The Rookie is set in the Red Sox' spring training locker room, which at the time was located at Payne Park.

The White Sox moved their spring training games from Tampa to Sarasota in 1960.

The Chicago White Sox and Texas Rangers played the last major league spring training game at Payne Park on March 30, 1988. The Sarasota White Sox began play in 1989 at Payne Park until its demolition in November 1990.

Public park

The City of Sarasota reopened the former ballpark-site as Payne Park on October 6, 2007 as a  public park space. The public park was built at a cost of $8.8 million, funded by a county-wide penny surtax.

It features a public skateboard park, Frisbee golf course, tracks for walking and riding bikes, lakes, and a cafe serving lunches and refreshments. In 2012, the city opened expansion to the park including a circus playground featuring a small waterpark on site.

References

External links 
 Historic Article
 Digital Ballparks: Payne Park

Minor league baseball venues
Boston Red Sox spring training venues
Chicago White Sox spring training venues
New York Giants (NL) spring training venues
Sarasota, Florida
Spring training ballparks
Parks in Sarasota County, Florida
1924 establishments in Florida
Sports venues completed in 1924
1990 disestablishments in Florida
Sports venues demolished in 1990
Demolished sports venues in Florida